This is a list of airlines currently operating in Iceland.

Scheduled airlines

Charter airlines

Cargo airlines

See also
List of defunct airlines of Iceland
Transport in Iceland
List of airports in Iceland
List of defunct airlines of Europe

References

Airlines
Iceland
Airlines
Iceland